Death Threatz is the second studio album by the American rapper MC Eiht and the fifth album by his group Compton's Most Wanted. It was released on April 2, 1996, through Epic Street. Recording sessions took place at Echo Sound and X-Factor Studios in Los Angeles. Production was handled primarily by Compton's Most Wanted members DJ Slip and MC Eiht, along with Prodeje of South Central Cartel, Gentry "Black Jack" Reed, Robert "Fonksta" Bacon and Tomie Mundy. It features guest performances from Young Prodeje and N.O.T.R.

The album peaked at number 16 on the Billboard 200 and at number 3 on the Top R&B/Hip-Hop Albums chart in the United States. It spawned two uncharted singles: a lead single "Thuggin It Up" and a promotional single "You Can't See Me" which both featured music videos.

Track listing

Personnel 
Aaron Tyler – main artist, vocals, keyboards (tracks: 2, 3, 6, 12, 14), producer (tracks: 2, 3, 6, 10, 12, 14), executive producer
Terry Keith Allen – main artist, producer (tracks: 9, 13, 15), co-producer (tracks: 2, 3, 10, 12, 14)
Michael Bryant – scratches (track 15)
Gene Heisser – featured artist, vocals (tracks: 3, 10)
Vernon Johnson – featured artist, vocals (tracks: 3, 13)
Patrick Earl Pitts – featured artist, vocals (track 11)
Cary Calvin – vocals (track 8)
Da Foe – featured artist (track 7)
William Fredric Zimmerman – keyboards (tracks: 2, 3, 6, 9, 12–14)
Austin Patterson – producer (tracks: 1, 4, 7, 11)
Gentry Reed – producer (tracks: 5, 8)
Robert Bacon, Jr. – co-producer (tracks: 1, 4, 7, 11)
Tomie Mundy – co-producer (tracks: 1, 4, 7, 11)
Alan Yoshida – mastering
Ted Lowe – A&R
Dante Ariola – art direction
Jay Papke – art direction
Christopher McCann – photography
Stephen Stickler – photography
Ken Smith – management

Charts

References

External links 

1996 albums
MC Eiht albums
Compton's Most Wanted albums
Epic Records albums
Albums produced by MC Eiht
Albums produced by Prodeje